Zadok the Priest (HWV 258) is a British anthem that was composed by George Frideric Handel for the coronation of King George II in 1727. Alongside The King Shall Rejoice, My Heart is Inditing, and Let Thy Hand Be Strengthened, Zadok the Priest is one of Handel's coronation anthems. One of Handel's best-known works, Zadok the Priest has been sung prior to the anointing of the sovereign at the coronation of every British monarch since its composition and has become recognised as a British patriotic anthem.

Text
Part of the traditional content of British coronations, the texts for all four anthems were picked by Handel—a personal selection from the most accessible account of an earlier coronation, that of James II in 1685. The text is a translation of the traditional antiphon, Unxerunt Salomonem, itself derived from the biblical account of the anointing of Solomon by the priest Zadok (1 Kings 1:38-40). These words have been used in every English, and later British, coronation since that of King Edgar at Bath Abbey in 973. An earlier setting is thought to have been written by Thomas Tomkins for the coronation of King Charles I in 1626, the text of which has survived but not the music. Henry Lawes wrote another for the coronation of King Charles II in 1661; this was also sung at James II's in 1685, although the music may have been amended to accommodate changes to the text made by Archbishop William Sancroft.

At the coronation itself on 11 October 1727, the choir of Westminster Abbey sang Zadok the Priest in the wrong part of the service; they had earlier entirely forgotten to sing one anthem and another ended "in confusion".

Lyrics
The lyrics of the piece are biblical, being a distillation of 1 Kings 1:34-45:

While the lyrics of "God Save the King" are based on the same scripture passage from which "Zadok the Priest" originated, the lyrics of "Zadok the Priest" do not change based on the sex of the sovereign. Because it is a hymn and pulled directly from scripture, and because the king in question is Solomon, it remains "king" even if the monarch is female.

Structure
Zadok the Priest is written for SS-AA-T-BB chorus and orchestra (two oboes, two bassoons, three trumpets, timpani, strings with three violin parts rather than the usual two, and continuo), in the key of D major. The music prepares a surprise in its orchestral introduction through the use of static layering of soft string textures followed by a sudden rousing forte tutti entrance, augmented by three trumpets.

The middle section "And all the people rejoic'd, and said" is a dance form in  time, with the choir singing chordally and a dotted rhythm in the strings.

The final section "God save the King", etc. is a return to common time, with the "God save the King" section heard chordally, interspersed with the Amens incorporating long semiquaver runs, taken in turn through the six voice parts (SAATBB) with the other parts singing quaver chords accompanying it. The chorus ends with a largo plagal cadence on "Alleluia".

In other contexts
Tony Britten rearranged Zadok the Priest in 1992, using it as the basis for the UEFA Champions League Anthem.

The song was played during the wedding processional of Crown Prince Frederik of Denmark and Mary Donaldson. Their wedding took place on 14 May 2004 at Copenhagen Cathedral.

See also
Handel's coronation anthems

References

External links
 
 

1727 compositions
Anthems by George Frideric Handel
British patriotic songs
Choral compositions
Compositions in D major
Coronations of British monarchs
Music based on the Bible